Queljata (possibly from Aymara qillqaña to write, -ta a suffix to indicate the participle, "written" or "something written") is a mountain in the eastern extensions Vilcanota mountain range in the Andes of Peru, about  high. It is located in the Cusco Region, Quispicanchi Province, Marcapata District. Queljata lies northeast of the peaks of Quinsachata, Quehuesiri and Huayruruni.

References

Mountains of Cusco Region
Mountains of Peru